Ball at the Metropol (German: Ball im Metropol) is a 1937 German drama film directed by Frank Wisbar and starring Heinrich George, Heinz von Cleve and Hilde Weissner.  The film's sets were designed by the art directors Fritz Maurischat and Anton Weber. It was based on the 1888 novel Irrungen, Wirrungen by Theodor Fontane. It premiered at the Gloria-Palast in Berlin.

Cast
 Heinrich George as 	Rudolf von Waltzien
 Heinz von Cleve as 	Eberhard von Waltzien
 Hilde Weissner as Margit Steltendorff
 Viktoria von Ballasko as	Gertrude Selle
 Elsa Wagner as Frau Selle
 Ursula Weißbach as 	Lotte Schultze
 Katja Specht as 	Eva Kreßt
 Franz Schafheitlin as 	Steltendorff
 Fred Goebel as Studerke
 Leopold von Ledebur as 	Graf Kreßt
 Heinz Klockow as 	von Restrow
 S.O. Schoening as von Prißwitz
 Bob Bauer as 	von Puttkammer
 Frau Finkelnburg as Baronin Malchin
 Fanny Cotta as 	Direktrice des Modehauses
 William Huch as Diener bei Baron von Waltzien
 Fred Köster as Gast beim Ball im Metropol
 Karl Platen as 	Werner, Diener
 Achim von Biel as Gesandter
 Margitta Zonewa as 	Sängerin

References

Bibliography 
 Goble, Alan. The Complete Index to Literary Sources in Film. Walter de Gruyter, 1999.
 Nicolella, Henry. Frank Wisbar: The Director of Ferryman Maria, from Germany to America and Back. McFarland, 2018.
 Winkel, Roel Vande & Welch, David. Cinema and the Swastika: The International Expansion of Third Reich Cinema. Palgrave MacMillan, 2011.

External links

1937 films
Films of Nazi Germany
1937 drama films
1930s German-language films
Films directed by Frank Wisbar
Films based on German novels
German black-and-white films
German drama films
1930s German films
Terra Film films

de:Ball im Metropol